The 1950 Delaware Fightin' Blue Hens football team was an American football team that represented the University of Delaware as an independent during the 1950 college football season. The team compiled a 2–5–1 record and was outscored by a total of 147 to 55. 

The team was led by William D. Murray in his eighth season as the program's head football coach. He also served as the school's athletic director. In January 1951, Murray was hired as the head football coach at Duke.

Schedule

References

Delaware
Delaware Fightin' Blue Hens football seasons
Delaware Fightin' Blue Hens football